is a Japanese former football player. He is currently manager J2 League club of Iwaki FC.

Playing career
Suguri was born in Fukuroi on July 29, 1976. After graduating from high school, he joined Japan Football League club Honda in 1995. He played many matches as a midfielder from first season and the club won the championship in 1996. In 1998, he moved to the  newly-promoted J1 League club, Consadole Sapporo. Although he played many matches in 1998, the club was relegated to the J2 League from 1999. In June 2000, he moved to Verdy Kawasaki. However, he hardly played. In 2001, he moved to the J2 club Omiya Ardija. Although he played in two seasons, he did not play many matches. In 2003, he moved to Sagan Tosu. He played many matches as a substitute in three seasons. In September 2005, he moved to Avispa Fukuoka on loan. He played many matches as a substitute and won the second place and was promoted to J1 at the end of 2005. In 2006, he returned to Sagan Tosu and retired at the end of the 2007 season.

Managerial career

Suguri was obtained the Japan Football Association official S-Class coach license in 2021.

On 9 December 2021, Suguri appointed Iwaki FC manager ahead for J3 League from next season.

On 6 November 2022, Suguri brought Iwaki FC promotion to the J2 League for the first time in history starting next season and they were crowned J3 League champions for the first time in their history.

Club statistics

Managerial statistics
.

Honours

Manager
Iwaki FC
J3 League : 2022

References

External links

1976 births
Living people
Association football people from Shizuoka Prefecture
Japanese footballers
J1 League players
J2 League players
Japan Football League (1992–1998) players
Honda FC players
Hokkaido Consadole Sapporo players
Tokyo Verdy players
Omiya Ardija players
Sagan Tosu players
Avispa Fukuoka players
Association football midfielders
Japanese football managers
J2 League managers
J3 League managers
Iwaki FC managers